A Night of Mystery is a 1928 American silent drama film based upon the play by Victorien Sardou, directed by Lothar Mendes and starring Adolphe Menjou and Evelyn Brent. The film is considered to be lost. A Night of Mystery is now a lost film, with no known archival holdings.

Cast
 Adolphe Menjou as Captain Ferreol
 Evelyn Brent as Gilberte Boismartel
 Nora Lane as Thérèse D'Egremont
 William Collier Jr. as Jérôme D'Egremont
 Raoul Paoli as Marcasse
 Claude King as Marquis Boismartel
 Frank Leigh as Rochemore

References

External links

1928 films
1928 drama films
Silent American drama films
American silent feature films
American black-and-white films
American films based on plays
Films based on works by Victorien Sardou
Films directed by Lothar Mendes
Films with screenplays by Herman J. Mankiewicz
Paramount Pictures films
Lost American films
1928 lost films
Lost drama films
1920s American films